Richard Cleghorn Overton (November 9, 1907 – September 30, 1988) was an American railroad historian, a founding member and first secretary of the Lexington Group in Transportation History, and a founding member and the first president of the Business History Conference.

Early life and education
Overton earned his BA in History in 1929, and his MA in Economics in 1934 at Williams College.  He completed his MA and PhD in History at Harvard University in 1944.

Career
Overton taught French at the Hotchkiss School, economics at Williams College, and history at North Adams State College, Amherst College, Harvard University, Northwestern University, the University of Western Ontario, and at Burr and Burton Academy. He served as a Director of the Central Vermont Railway.

Railway history
Overton wrote several books on railroad history, and more than 100 articles and book reviews on the subject. Joe W. Kizzia in "Richard C. Overton Railroad Historian. - book reviews", summed up Overton's view on railroad history: "...railroads had so much to do with making the United States into 'us'."  Overton wrote in an article that appeared in Railway Age in February 1948:
"It is superfluous to recall that railways have been an essential prerequisite to the development of American industry, commerce, and agriculture. They opened the great West, built cities, enabled us to fight our wars effectively, and have been one of the greatest forces toward nationalism in our history."

Overton received the Railroad History Senior Achievement award For a Lifetime of Significant Contribution to the Writing, Preservation, and Interpretation of North America's Railroading History from the Railway & Locomotive Historical Society on May 8, 1982.

Selected works 

 Perkins/Budd: Railway Statesmen of the Burlington (Contributions in Economics and Economic History) (Greenwood, 1982)
 Burlington Route: A History of the Burlington Lines (Knopf, 1965)
 Gulf to Rockies: The Heritage of the Fort Worth and Denver-Colorado and Southern Railways, 1861-1898 (University of Texas Press, 1953)
 Burlington West: A colonization history of the Burlington Railroad (Harvard University Press, 1941)
Over My Shoulder: A Memoir, privately printed

References 

 Hausman, William J. Business and Economic History, College of William and Mary, Second Series Volume 16,  1989

External links
 The Business History Conference
 Railway & Locomotive Historical Society, Inc

Archives
 Richard C. Overton Papers, Northwestern University Archives
 Lexington Group Records, Northwestern University Archives
 Richard C. Overton Railroad Historian, Edited by H. Roger Grant The Lexington Group, Inc

1988 deaths
Harvard University alumni
1907 births
Railway historians
Williams College alumni